The Australian Film Walk of Fame is a collection of plaques on the footpath outside the Ritz Cinema in the suburb of Randwick, Sydney, Australia. Formed in 2008 at the Ritz Cinema, the initiative was established to honour Australian actors and actresses for their contributions to Australian cinema.

History
The Australian Film Walk of Fame was initially established in 2008 by Randwick City Council and the Australian Film Festival (organized by Barry Watterson) at the Randwick Ritz under the title of the 'Walk of Fame'. Recipients inducted into the Walk of Fame from 2008 to 2009 include Michael Caton, Roy Billing and Charles Tingwell.

In conjunction with the inaugural Australian Film Festival, which premiered on 24 February 2010 at Randwick Ritz cinema, the Randwick Ritz's Walk of Fame was officially renamed the Australian Film Walk of Fame.

The Australian Film Walk of Fame now initiates new members annually at the conclusion of the Australian Film Festival, in partnership with Randwick Council, the Ritz Cinema and The Spot Chamber of Commerce.

2010: 7 March 
On 7 March 2010, the Australian Film Festival concluded with The Spot Food and Film Festival at Randwick and the induction of Steve Bisley and Claudia Karvan to the Australian Film Walk of Fame.

2011: 13 March 
In 2011, Gary Sweet and Jack Thompson were both initiated to the Australian Film Walk of Fame.

2022: 28 April 
The Australian Film Walk of Fame was revived after a decade with a new plaque unveiled to honour actor, writer and director Leah Purcell AM at the gala screening of The Drover's Wife: The Legend of Molly Johnson at Randwick Ritz Cinemas.

Controversy
The title of the Australian Film Walk of Fame has been contested by Alan Black, the chairman of the Australian Walk of Fame in Tweed Heads. Black claims that the Australian Film Walk of Fame has capitalised on his Australian Walk of Fame, which includes multiple actors, sporting personalities and animals. In response to Black's criticism, Randwick Council issued a statement in defense of Watterson's Australian Film Walk of Fame, citing the fact that "There are many different 'walks of fame' already in existence, including the Surfing Walk of Fame at Maroubra Beach. The Australian Film Walk of Fame at Randwick specifically recognises home-grown acting talent and people who have made significant contributions to the Australian film industry." Randwick Council and Barry Watterson jointly own the trademark rights to the Australian Film Walk of Fame plaque design.

Members of the Australian Film Walk of Fame

References

External links 
 Australian Film Festival Official Website 

Cinema of Australia